All You Need Is Now was a worldwide concert tour by British new wave band Duran Duran in support of the group's 13th studio album with the same name, which was released exclusively on iTunes on 21 December 2010 and the expanded physical album and various format special packages was released on 22 March 2011. It officially started on 3 February 2011 in Grand Prairie, Texas.

The Manchester concert on 16 December 2011 was filmed and recorded for the video and audio release A Diamond in the Mind: Live 2011.

Support acts
 Royseven – (Dublin)
 CocknBullKid – (United Kingdom)
A Silent Express – (Munich, Leipzig, Dortmund & Berlin)

Tour dates

Cancelled and Rescheduled shows

Broadcasts
The live performance at the Mayan Theater in Los Angeles was filmed by David Lynch for American Express' Unstaged concert series and streamed live on YouTube on 23 March 2011. It made use of three simultaneous cameras from different positions within the theater.

Band members

Duran Duran 
 Simon Le Bon – lead vocals
 John Taylor – bass, backing vocals
 Roger Taylor – drums
 Nick Rhodes – keyboards, backing vocals

Additional musicians 
 Dominic Brown – guitars, backing vocals
 Simon Willescroft – tenor saxophone, percussion
 Anna Ross – backing vocals
 Chastity Ashley – percussion (2011 North America dates)
 Dawne Adams – percussion (2011 United Kingdom dates)

Guest artists
 Beth Ditto
 Mark Ronson
 Kelis
 Gerard Way

See also
 List of Duran Duran concert tours

References

External links
 Duran Duran official website

Duran Duran
2011 concert tours
2012 concert tours